Trnava is a small town in the municipality of Čačak, Serbia. According to the 2011 census, the town has a population of 2,913 people.

References

Populated places in Moravica District